The 30th Annual Nickelodeon Kids' Choice Awards was held on March 11, 2017, at the Galen Center on the University of Southern California campus in Los Angeles and was broadcast live on Nickelodeon and either live or with tape delay across all of Nickelodeon's international networks. John Cena hosted the ceremony. This is the earliest Kids' Choice Awards ceremony date to take place in the year, with the latest being the 1989 ceremony on June 25, 1989.

A new episode of one of Nickelodeon's television series, Henry Danger, premiered right before the ceremony. Jace Norman subsequently led the transfer from the show to the ceremony. Afterwards, an unlisted airing of the Hunter Street premiere was shown.

Hosts
John Cena
Daniella Monet and Meg DeAngelis (preshow)

Performances

Presenters

Slimed celebrities
Demi Lovato
Chris Pratt
Kevin Hart
John Cena

Winners and nominees
The nominees were announced on February 2, 2017.
28 categories were announced that were available worldwide with an additional 40 for regional categories
Winners are listed first, in bold. Other nominees are in alphabetical order.

Movies

Television

Music

Miscellaneous

International
Source: Various Nick Sites

References

External links
 

Nickelodeon Kids' Choice Awards
2017 awards in the United States
2017 in American television
2017 in Los Angeles
2017 television awards
March 2017 events in the United States
Television shows directed by Glenn Weiss